Willikies (sometimes spelled Willikie's) is a small settlement in Saint Philip Parish, located in the eastern part of Antigua island in Antigua and Barbuda.

It is located to the north of Nonsuch Bay, between Seaton's and Indian Town Point.

Demographics 
Willikies has six enumeration districts.

 60100 Willikies-North 
 60200 Willikies-West 
 60300 Willikies-Central
 60401 Willikies-S_1
 60402 Willikies-S_2
 60500 Willikies-East

Census Data

See also

References

Populated places in Antigua and Barbuda
Saint Philip Parish, Antigua and Barbuda